The 1st Cherokee Mounted Rifles was a Confederate States Army regiment which fought in the Indian Territory during the American Civil War. It was formed from the merger of two predecessor units the First Regiment of Cherokee Mounted Rifles, and the Second Regiment of Cherokee Mounted Rifles.  The first commander was Col. John Drew, while the second was Stand Watie.

Origin
Confederate officials commissioned Stand Watie a colonel in the Confederate States Army in July 1861 and authorized him to raise a military unit known as the Cherokee Mounted Volunteers. After Cherokee  Principal Chief John Ross signed the Cherokee-Confederate treaty of alliance in October 1861, he and the Cherokee Council authorized   and raised the First Regiment of Cherokee Mounted Rifles, commanded by Col. John Drew. Drew's regimental officers and men were largely Cherokees of full blood status, who were ideologically uncommitted to the goals of the Confederacy, but were loyal to Chief John Ross. At this time, Watie's regiment became the Second Regiment of Cherokee Mounted Rifles. Watie's regiment consisted largely of Cherokees of mixed blood (Métis) who, as slaveholders, favored the Confederate cause.

Dissension among the troops
Drew's regiment became part of Col. Cooper's command and was ordered to help stop the flight of Union-supporting Creeks, led by their principal chief Opothleyahola, who were attempting to flee to Kansas. Although the unit participated in the Battle of Round Mountain, the Battle of Chusto-Talasah, and the Battle of Chustenahlah, they made known their dislike for fighting the Creeks, who had done the Cherokees no harm. They had expected to be fighting the invading Yankees, instead.

Reorganization of the regiment
A portion of Drew's regiment deserted in late 1861. Following the Battle of Old Fort Wayne in October 1862, most of the remainder of Drew's men, including Maj. Thomas Pegg, deserted to the Union army. What remained of his troops was combined with Watie's regiment and reorganized as the First Regiment of Cherokee Mounted Rifles with Watie in command.

Successes under Watie
During the Civil War, Watie's troops participated in twenty-seven major engagements and numerous smaller skirmishes. Although some of the engagements were set-piece battles, most of their activities utilized guerrilla tactics. Watie's men launched raids from south of the Canadian River throughout northern-held Indian Territory and into Kansas and Missouri, tying down thousands of Union troops. Poorly equipped and armed mostly with castoff rifles or captured weapons, the Cherokees were well suited to this type of warfare. Watie was promoted to brigadier general in May 1864.

Watie's most spectacular victories included the Ambush of the steamboat J. R. Williams, in June 1864, and the capture of a Union wagon train at the Second Battle of Cabin Creek in September 1864. His three most infamous actions were the burning of Rose Cottage, home of Chief John Ross, and the Cherokee Council House in October 1863, and the massacre of detachments of the First Kansas Colored Infantry and 2nd Regiment Kansas Volunteer Cavalry at the Hay Camp Action (a.k.a. the Battle of Flat Rock) in September 1864.

In February 1865 Watie was given command of the Indian Division of Indian Territory but was unable to launch any offensive operations. He released most of his troops following the collapse of Confederate resistance in the spring of 1865. After participating in the Camp Napoleon Council in May, Stand Watie officially surrendered on June 23, 1865, becoming the last Confederate general to lay down his arms. The regiment was dissolved.

Battle of Pea Ridge
This battle was on March 6–8, 1862 in Benton County, Arkansas, with a Union victory.

Battle of Old Fort Wayne
This battle was on October 22, 1862, in Fort Wayne, Indian Territory, with a Union victory.

Battle of Cabin Creek
This battle was on July 1–2, 1863 in Mayes County, Oklahoma, with a Union victory.

Notes

See also

Indian cavalry
Confederate units of Indian Territory
Indian Territory
Stand Watie
John Drew (Cherokee)

References

External links
Regimental roster
Reenactment unit
Unit history
 Encyclopedia of Oklahoma History and Culture - First Cherokee Mounted Rifles
 Oklahoma Digital Maps: Digital Collections of Oklahoma and Indian Territory

Cherokee Confederates
Units and formations of the Confederate States Army from Indian Territory
Cherokee Nation (1794–1907)
1861 establishments in Indian Territory
1865 disestablishments in Indian Territory
Military units and formations established in 1861
Military units and formations disestablished in 1865